Laxman Mahadu Matera was an Indian politician and leader of Communist Party of India. He represented Thane constituency in 2nd Lok Sabha.

He participates in the Kisan Movement and works for the  emancipation and uplift of Scheduled Tribes in Thane District.

References

Communist Party of India politicians from Maharashtra
Living people
Year of birth missing (living people)
India MPs 1957–1962